Hang Time is an American teen sitcom that aired on NBC. The program first aired on September 9, 1995, and ran for six seasons, with its final first-run episode airing on December 16, 2000.

Series overview

Episodes

Season 1 (1995)
The cast for the first season of Hang Time was: 

 David Hanson as Chris Atwater
 Daniella Deutscher as Julie Connor
 Chad Gabriel as Danny Mellon
 Megan Parlen as Mary Beth Pepperton
 Robert Michael Ryan as Earl Hatfield
 Christian Belnavis as Michael Maxwell
 Hillary Tuck as Samantha Morgan
 Reggie Theus as Coach Bill Fuller

Season 2 (1996)
The cast for the second season of Hang Time was: 

 Daniella Deutscher as Julie Connor
 Chad Gabriel as Danny Mellon
 Megan Parlen as Mary Beth Pepperton
 Kevin Bell as Josh Sanders
 Michael Sullivan as Vince D'Amata
 Anthony Anderson as Theodore "Teddy" Brodis
 Paige Peterson as Amy Wright
 Reggie Theus as Coach Bill Fuller

Season 3 (1997)
The cast for the third season of Hang Time was: 

 Daniella Deutscher as Julie Connor
 Chad Gabriel as Danny Mellon
 Megan Parlen as Mary Beth Pepperton
 Michael Sullivan as Vince D'Amata
 Anthony Anderson as Theodore "Teddy" Brodis
 Adam Frost as Michael Manning
 Amber Barretto as Kristy Ford
 Reggie Theus as Coach Bill Fuller

Season 4 (1998)
The cast for the fourth season of Hang Time was: 

 Daniella Deutscher as Julie Connor
 Megan Parlen as Mary Beth Pepperton
 Adam Frost as Michael Manning
 Amber Barretto as Kristy Ford
 Mark Famiglietti as Nick Hammer
 Danso Gordon as Kenny "Silk" Hayes
 James Villani as Rico Bocso
 Dick Butkus as Coach Mike Katowinski

Season 5 (1999–2000)
Seasons 5 and 6 of Hang Time were filmed together as a single production, so the cast for the fifth and sixth seasons of Hang Time was the same: 

 Daniella Deutscher as Julie Connor
 Megan Parlen as Mary Beth Pepperton
 Adam Frost as Michael Manning
 Amber Barretto as Kristy Ford
 Danso Gordon as Kenny "Silk" Hayes
 Phillip Glasser as Eugene Brown
 Jay Hernandez as Antonio Lopez
 Dick Butkus as Coach Mike Katowinski

Season 6 (2000)
As season 6 of Hang Time was filmed together with season 5 as a single production, the cast for the sixth season of Hang Time was the same as the cast for the fifth season.

External links 
 
 

Lists of American sitcom episodes
Lists of American teen comedy television series episodes